Jeffrey Greenwood Smith (October 14, 1921 – March 21, 2021) was a lieutenant general in the United States Army. He was a member of the Virginia Military Institute (VMI) Class of 1943. He also served as Commandant of VMI in the 1960s. As a lieutenant general, he was Commander of the First United States Army from 1975 to 1979. He died in March 2021 in Fort Belvoir, Virginia at the age of 99.

References

1921 births
2021 deaths
Johns Hopkins University alumni
National War College alumni
Recipients of the Distinguished Flying Cross (United States)
Recipients of the Legion of Merit
Recipients of the Silver Star
United States Army Command and General Staff College alumni
United States Army generals
United States Army personnel of the Vietnam War
United States Army personnel of World War II
Virginia Military Institute alumni
Virginia Military Institute faculty
Military personnel from San Antonio
Burials at Arlington National Cemetery